John Green (born 10 March 1918, date of death unknown) was a Trinidadian cricketer. He played in two first-class matches for Trinidad and Tobago in 1935/36. Green is deceased.

See also
 List of Trinidadian representative cricketers

References

External links
 

1918 births
Year of death missing
Trinidad and Tobago cricketers